Sui typically refers to

 Sui dynasty (581–618), a Chinese dynasty notable for reuniting the country and establishing the Grand Canal

Sui or SUI may also refer to:

Places 

 Sui County, Henan, China
 Sui County, Hubei in western Suizhou, Hubei in central China
 Suizhou, Hubei, China, formerly Sui County
 Sui, Bhiwani, Haryana, India
 Sui, Rajasthan, India
 Sui, Balochistan, Pakistan
 Sui gas field, near Sui, Balochistan
 Switzerland (SUI is its International Olympic Committee code or FIFA country code, based on the French name suisse)
 Suisun–Fairfield station, Amtrak station code SUI
 State University of Iowa, the legal name of the University of Iowa
 Sukhumi Babushara Airport, IATA code SUI

People 
 Sui (surname), a transcription of two Chinese surnames
 Sui people, one of the Kam–Sui peoples, an ethnic group of China and Vietnam
Sui language spoken by the Shui
 Sui (state), a Zhou-dynasty Chinese state

Other 

 Sui, meaning "years of age" in Chinese age reckoning
 Sui or mizu, 水, meaning "Water" in Japanese, one of the elements in the Japanese system of five elements and representing the fluid, flowing, formless things in the world
 Sui (粋), an ideal in Japanese aesthetics similar to iki
 Sui generis, a Latin phrase meaning "of itself"
 Sui iuris, a Latin phrase "of one's own right"
 Simplified user interface, a stylised illustration used in marketing, user onboarding and technical communication
 Sonic user interface or speech user interface, similar to GUI for graphical user interface
 Societate Ukrainian de Interlingua, Interlingua for the Ukrainian Society for Interlingua
 Stress urinary incontinence, also known as effort incontinence
 Stanford University Interim, a type of channel model
 Speleological Union of Ireland, the All-Ireland representative body for caving